Time Speaks, subtitled Dedicated to the Memory of Clifford Brown, is an album by saxophonist/composer Benny Golson that was recorded in 1982 and released on the Japanese Baystate label the following year. The album features trumpeters Freddie Hubbard and Woody Shaw performing tunes associated with, or inspired by, Clifford Brown and was reissued on the Dutch Timeless label in 1984.

Reception

The AllMusic review by Scott Yanow said "This set was chiefly notable for teaming together for the first time trumpeters Freddie Hubbard and Woody Shaw. Ostensibly a tribute to Clifford Brown, the sextet date only has two songs actually played by Brown. No matter; it is for the Hubbard-Shaw matchup that this straight-ahead outing is mostly recommended, as the two trumpeters provide most of the fireworks".

Track listing 
All compositions by Benny Golson, except where noted
 "I'll Remember April" (Gene de Paul, Patricia Johnston and Don Raye) – 8:00
 "Time Speaks" – 10:27
 "No Dancin'" – 7:01
 "Jordu" (Duke Jordan) – 10:38
 "Blues for Duane" (Freddie Hubbard) – 5:14
 "Theme for Maxine" (Woody Shaw) – 8:18

Personnel 
Benny Golson – tenor saxophone
Freddie Hubbard, Woody Shaw – trumpet
Kenny Barron – piano
Cecil McBee - bass 
Ben Riley – drums

Production
Makoto Kimata – producer
Rudy Van Gelder – engineer

References 

Benny Golson albums
Clifford Brown tribute albums
1983 albums
Baystate Records albums
Timeless Records albums
Albums recorded at Van Gelder Studio